is a Nippon Professional Baseball player for the Tohoku Rakuten Golden Eagles in Japan's Pacific League.

External links

NPB.com

1984 births
Living people
Nippon Professional Baseball pitchers
Ritsumeikan University alumni
Baseball people from Hyōgo Prefecture
Tohoku Rakuten Golden Eagles players
Yomiuri Giants players
Melbourne Aces players
Japanese expatriate baseball players in Australia
Sportspeople from Amagasaki